The Cape Winelands District Municipality, formerly the Boland District Municipality, is a district municipality located in the Boland region of the Western Cape province of South Africa. As of 2011, it had a population of 787,490. The largest towns in the municipality are Paarl, Worcester, Stellenbosch and Wellington.

Geography

In Afrikaans Boland means "up land" or "the higher land" or "the land above" (i.e. in contrast to the low coastal areas of the original Dutch settlement at the Cape). However, the term "Boland", as originally used, was a loose concept, with no defined borders (cf. the informal but not meaningless terms "The Sahara" or "The Rocky Mountains"). The Boland is generally mountainous, with range after range of beautiful and isolated sandstone peaks reaching towards 2000m but also has broad, fertile valleys that are home to some of the country's finest vineyards.

The region has a Mediterranean climate, with hot, dry summers are hot and cool, damp winters, with snow on the peaks during August and September. The diverse geography includes peaks, ranges, escarpments, valleys, cliffs, rivers, pools, waterfalls, screes, canyons, springs, forests, caves and other natural features.

The Cape Winelands District Municipality is divided into five local municipalities, which are described in the following table.

Adjacent municipalities
 Namakwa District Municipality, Northern Cape (north)
 Central Karoo District Municipality (east)
 Garden Route District Municipality (east)
 Overberg District Municipality (south)
 City of Cape Town (southwest)
 West Coast District Municipality (west)

History
At the end of the apartheid era the area that is today the Cape Winelands District Municipality formed part of two Regional Services Councils (RSCs). The western parttoday's Drakenstein and Stellenbosch local municipalitieswas joined with the Cape Town metropolitan area in the Western Cape RSC. The eastern parttoday's Witzenberg, Breede Valley and Langeberg local municipalitiesformed the Breërivier RSC. The towns within the area were governed by various local authorities divided along racial lines.

After the national elections of 1994 a process of local government transformation began, in which negotiations were held between the existing local authorities, political parties, and local community organisations. In late 1994 and early 1995 the racially-divided local authorities were replaced by transitional local councils (TLCs) for each town and village. In February 1995 the Western Cape RSC was divided into the Cape Metropolitan Council for the Cape Town metropolitan area and the Winelands RSC for the Drakenstein–Stellenbosch area.

When elections were held in May 1996, the Winelands and Breërivier RSCs were reconstituted as District Councils (DCs). Transitional representative councils (TRCs) were also elected to represent the rural areasPaarl and Stellenbosch TRCs in the Winelands RSC, and Witzenberg, Matroosberg and Wynland TRCs in the Breërivier RSC.

The local government transformation process was completed with the local elections of December 2000, when the Winelands and Breërivier DCs were replaced by the Boland District Municipality. The TLCs and TRCs were replaced by five local municipalities as well as a large District Management Area (DMA) in the sparsely-populated eastern part of the district. In 2004 the name "Boland" was changed to "Cape Winelands". In 2011 DMAs were abolished and the local municipalities extended to cover the whole district.

Politics

The council of the Cape Winelands District Municipality consists of forty-one councillors, of whom seventeen are directly elected by party-list proportional representation. The other twenty-four councillors are appointed by the councils of the constituent local municipalities: eight by Drakenstein, five each by Stellenbosch and Breede Valley, and three each by Witzenberg and Langeberg.

After then elections of 3 August 2016 the Democratic Alliance (DA) obtained a majority of 27 seats on the council. The executive mayor is Dr Helena von Schlicht of the DA, and the deputy mayor is Dirk Swart, also of the DA.

The following table shows the composition of the council after the 2016 election.

The following table shows the results of the election of the seventeen directly-elected councillors.

Demographics
The following statistics are from the 2011 Census. Note that due to fuzzing applied to statistics, columns may not sum to exactly the indicated total.

References

External links
 Official website
 Cape Winelands District Municipality on the Western Cape Government website

District municipalities of the Western Cape
Cape Winelands District Municipality